Conoclinium mayfieldii is a Mexican species of flowering plants in the family Asteraceae. It has a discontinuous distribution, found in the Sierra Madre Occidental in Chihuahua and Durango, and also in the Sierra Madre Oriental in Tamaulipas. These two mountain ranges are separated by the Chihuahuan Desert, 400 km wide.

Conoclinium mayfieldii is a reclining herb up to 70 cm (28 inches) tall. Leaves are opposite, egg-shaped. The plant usually produces several flower heads, each with blue or lavender disc florets but no ray florets.

The species is named for American botanist Mark H. Mayfield.

References

External links
photo of herbarium specimen at herbarium of the Universidad Autónoma Nacional de México, collected in Tamaulipas

Eupatorieae
Endemic flora of Mexico
Plants described in 1996
Flora of the Sierra Madre Occidental
Flora of the Sierra Madre Oriental